József Bujáki (born 13 December 1975) is a Hungarian footballer who plays for Békéscsabai Előre FC as a defender.

References

1975 births
Living people
Footballers from Budapest
Hungarian footballers
Association football defenders
Budapest Honvéd FC players
Tiszakécske FC footballers
Soroksári TE footballers
Ceglédi VSE footballers
Békéscsaba 1912 Előre footballers